THL may refer to:

Tibetan and Himalayan Library,  University of Virginia
 THL Simplified Phonetic Transcription of Standard Tibetan
Licentiate of Theology (Th.L.), degree
Finnish Institute for Health and Welfare (THL)
Thomas H. Lee Partners, a private equity firm
Tourism Holdings Limited, a New Zealand tourism company
Tinfoil Hat Linux distribution
ISO 639-3 language code for the Dangaura varieties of the Tharu languages
IATA airport code for Tachilek Airport
Tile Hill railway station, West Midlands, England, station code
Technology Happy Life, a Chinese smartphone manufacturer
Tropical Hockey League, a Miami-based hockey league of the late 1930s